Scolopendra angulata is a species of centipede commonly found in Barbados. They are also found in Venezuela and neighbouring countries in South America and the Caribbean such as Ecuador and Colombia.

There are three subspecies; Scolopendra angulata angulata (Newport, 1844), Scolopendra angulata explorans (Chamberlin, 1914), and Scolopendra angulata moojeni (Bücherl, 1943). The latter subspecies is excluded by some sources. S. s. explorans was originally classified by Chamberlin as Scolopendra explorans, and was only proposed a subspecies of S. angulata by Bücherl in 1942 .

References

External links 
https://eol.org/pages/1033177
https://www.inaturalist.org/taxa/734768-Scolopendra-angulata/browse_photos

angulata
Arthropods of South America
Fauna of Barbados
Arthropods of the Caribbean
Fauna of Venezuela
Fauna of Colombia
Fauna of Ecuador